Košaki is a former settlement north of Maribor in the City Municipality of Maribor in northeastern Slovenia. Since 2008, it has been part of Maribor.

References

External links
Košaki on Geopedia

Geography of Maribor
Former settlements in Slovenia
2008 disestablishments in Slovenia